Rechnoy is a rural locality (a settlement) in Seftrenskoye Rural Settlement of Verkhnetoyemsky District, Arkhangelsk Oblast, Russia. The population was 28 as of 2010.

Geography 
Rechnoy is located 33 km northwest of Verkhnyaya Toyma (the district's administrative centre) by road. Zelennik is the nearest rural locality.

References 

Rural localities in Verkhnetoyemsky District